Alexander Shepard McFarlan  (October 11, 1869 – March 2, 1939), was a Major League Baseball outfielder.

Sources

1869 births
1939 deaths
Major League Baseball outfielders
Baseball players from St. Louis
Louisville Colonels players
19th-century baseball players
Dallas Hams players
Fort Worth Panthers players
Rockford Hustlers players
Galveston Sand Crabs players
San Antonio Missionaries players
Quincy Ravens players
Little Rock Travelers players
Montgomery Grays players
Norfolk Braves players
Terre Haute Hottentots players
Asheville Moonshiners players
Minor league baseball managers
People from Pewee Valley, Kentucky